"I Started a Joke" is a song by the Bee Gees from their 1968 album Idea, which was released as a single in December of that year. It was not released as a single in the United Kingdom, where buyers who could not afford the album had to content themselves with a Polydor version by Heath Hampstead. This is the last Bee Gees single to feature Vince Melouney's  guitar work, as he left the band in early December after this song was released as a single.

The song's B-side was "Kilburn Towers", except in France, where "Swan Song" was used. "I Started a Joke" was written by Robin mainly, with help from Barry and Maurice Gibb on the bridge. It was produced by the Bee Gees with Robert Stigwood.

Composition and recording
Songs for the Idea album were completed on 20 June. "I Started A Joke" was the last to be recorded.

According to Robin Gibb, the melancholic melody of the song was inspired by the sounds on board an aeroplane: 

"There was a lot of that in those days" Barry laughed, "There was a lot of psychedelia and the idea that if you wrote something, even if it sounded ridiculous, somebody would find the meaning for it, and that was the truth".

Structure and release
The song was originally recorded in the key of G major and has two contrasting sections. The verse sections consist of a cycle of G Bm C and D chords. The chords for the bridge section are Em Bm C G Bm Em Am D.

The promotional video for "I Started a Joke" was directed by Jean-Christophe Averty. It was filmed in Brussels as part of the Idea TV Special and features floating question marks on the song while Robin sings. In the video, Maurice is shown playing a Rickenbacker 4001 and Vince Melouney playing a Gibson ES-335.

The song reached #1 in Canada, New Zealand and Australia. In Canada, it spent two weeks as the number one in RPM charts. "I Started a Joke" debuted at #66 at the United States Cashbox magazine in the week of 14 December 1968.

Robin Gibb's son played "I Started a Joke" on his phone just after his father died on 20 May 2012. Robin-John Gibb told The Sun:

When he passed away we went out, they took the equipment away and we came back in, I picked up my phone and found "I Started a Joke" on YouTube and played it. I put the phone on his chest and that was the first time I broke down. I knew that song and its lyrics were perfect for that moment. That song will always have new meaning to me now.

Cash Box described it as being in the Bee Gees' "softer" style, saying it was more in the style of "Words" than "Gotta Get a Message to You," and said that the "paradoxical imagery offers magnetic charm to mystical interpretation."

Personnel 
Bee Gees
 Robin Gibb – lead and backing vocals
 Barry Gibb – rhythm guitar
 Maurice Gibb – bass guitar, piano, hammond organ, mellotron
 Vince Melouney – lead guitar
 Colin Petersen – drums

Additional musician and production
 Bill Shepherd – orchestral arrangement
 Bee Gees, Robert Stigwood – producer

Charts

Weekly charts

Year-end charts

Faith No More version

Faith No More originally covered "I Started a Joke" as a B-side for their 1995 single "Digging the Grave". It also appeared on some versions of their fifth studio album King for a Day... Fool for a Lifetime but following the band's dissolution in 1998 it was released as a single with their greatest hits album Who Cares a Lot?. The music video was filmed on 8 September 1998, after Faith No More had disbanded five months earlier and featured none of the band members. It was directed by Vito Rocco, filmed by Nick Sawyer with make-up by Julie Nightingale and Dani Richardson with Gabi Norland as the clapper loader. British actors Martin Freeman and Shaun Dingwall both feature in the promo, along with performance artist David Hoyle as the karaoke singer, and also stars Michelle Butterly of the ITV series, Benidorm. Derren Litten, the writer of Benidorm and a contributor to The Catherine Tate Show, is also seen in the video.

Track listing
Disc one
"I Started a Joke" – 3:03
"The World Is Yours" – 5:52
"Midnight Cowboy" (Live) – 1:01

Disc two
"I Started a Joke" – 3:03
"This Guy's in Love with You" (Live) – 4:20
"We Care a Lot" (Live) – 3:55

Live tracks recorded on 21 October 1997 at the Horden Pavilion, Sydney, Australia by MTV Australia.

Charts

Other notable cover versions
In 1997, German band Element of Crime took a cover for the  tribute-sampler We Love The Bee Gees; they released it also 1998 as own single and another time 2010 on their own album Fremde Federn.
In 1998, Robbie Williams with The Orb released a reggae rendition of the song and it was included on the Bee Gees Tribute Album: Gotta Get a Message for You as a fundraiser for Live Challenge '99.
In June 2016, German satirist Jan Böhmermann covered the song live on his TV show Neo Magazin Royale, commenting on the Böhmermann affair.
 The Beautiful South, 1992

Parodies
"I Started a Joke" was parodied by a Radio Free Vestibule sketch in which a voiced-over commentary takes the lyrics completely literally, appeared on the film Zoolander as covered by The Wallflowers.
The song "I Started a Joke" was featured heavily in the ending of the film Penn & Teller Get Killed, which features the two magicians playing a succession of increasingly elaborate practical jokes on each other with a fatal conclusion. 
"I Started a Joke" was recited in The Fighter, when Dickie Eklund (Christian Bale) sings it in an attempt to console his mother Alice (Melissa Leo) following an attempt by him to hide his crack addiction. 
"I Started a Joke" appeared in one of the sketches in MTV's The State comedy television show.

References

External links
 A short "I Started A Joke" background and song themes
 List of Bee Gees song parodies, including "I Started a Joke"

Bee Gees songs
Demis Roussos songs
1968 singles
1968 songs
1969 singles
1998 singles
Songs written by Barry Gibb
Songs written by Maurice Gibb
Songs written by Robin Gibb
British soft rock songs
The Cascades (band) songs
Faith No More songs
Song recordings produced by Barry Gibb
Song recordings produced by Maurice Gibb
Song recordings produced by Robin Gibb
Song recordings produced by Robert Stigwood
Polydor Records singles
Atco Records singles
Slash Records singles
Songs about suicide
Number-one singles in Australia
Number-one singles in Brazil
RPM Top Singles number-one singles
Number-one singles in Denmark
Number-one singles in New Zealand